Ravalkole is a village in Medchal mandal, located in Rangareddy district of Telangana, India.

References

Villages in Ranga Reddy district